Jonathan Vindician Wartiovaara (23 August 1875, Antrea - 9 December 1937; surname until 1906 Weckman) was a Finnish civil servant and politician. He served as Minister of Finance from 15 March 1920 to 9 April 1921. Wartiovaara was a member of the National Coalition Party.

References

1875 births
1937 deaths
People from Kamennogorsk
People from Viipuri Province (Grand Duchy of Finland)
Finnish Party politicians
National Coalition Party politicians
Ministers of Finance of Finland
People of the Finnish Civil War (White side)
University of Helsinki alumni